In demonology, Malphas is a demon who first appears in Johann Weyer's Pseudomonarchia Daemonum. That work and the Lesser Key of Solomon describe him as a mighty Great President of Hell, with 40 legions of demons under his command and is second in command under Satan. He appears as a raven, but if requested, will instead resemble a man with a hoarse voice. Malphas is said to build houses, high towers and strongholds, throw down the buildings of the enemies, destroy the enemies' desires or thoughts (and/or make them known to the conjurer) and all that they have done, give good familiars, and quickly bring artificers together from all places of the world.  According to the writers, Malphas accepts willingly and kindly any sacrifice offered to him, but then he will deceive the conjurer.

In popular culture

 Malphas appears as the secondary antagonist of the 2015 Freeform series Dead of Summer
 Malphas is a minor antagonist in the 2019 video game Devil May Cry 5, appearing as a deformed bird-like demon fused to a multi-headed witch
 Malphas appears as a boss in the 2010 MMO Realm of the Mad God
 Malphas appears as a summonable demon in the 2009 game Bayonetta, as well as Bayonetta 2 and Bayonetta 3. 
 Malphas appears as a boss in Castlevania: Symphony of the Night, Dawn of Sorrow, and as a lesser enemy in Portrait of Ruin and Grimoire of Souls. In Symphony of the Night, he is called "Karasuman," referring to his crow-like appearance with his name containing the Japanese word for crow.
 Malphas makes an appearance in the second season of the Castlevania animated series on Netflix, as a demon that the heroes fight before facing off with Dracula.
Malphas is the last name of the demonic guardian of Nick, Caleb in The Chronicles of Nick series by Sherrilyn Kenyon. He is part god in the series with his father being a primal god and his mother a daeve (a mid level demon)
Malphas, the ancient one, reveals himself during the process of the exorcism of a girl by the two priests in the 2015 Korean horror film The Priests
Malphas appears as a demon in the 2016 point-and-click adventure video game, Goetia
Malphas appears in the book Wrath of Angels by John Connolly
Malphas appears as one of the demonlords in the manhwa Skeleton Soldier Couldn’t Protect the Dungeon, where he has the appearance of a giant crow with red gems around its neck
 In the animated TV-series The Owl House, Malphas is the master librarian of Bonesborough Library
 Malphas appears as an antagonist in the Light Novel "Shin no Jitsuryoku wa Girigiri Made Kakushite Iyou to Omou".
 Malphas appears as an antagonist in the game Faith: The Unholy Trinity.

See also
The Lesser Key of Solomon

Sources
S. L. MacGregor Mathers, A. Crowley, The Goetia: The Lesser Key of Solomon the King (1904). 1995 reprint: .

References 

Goetic demons